The Cancer Research Institute (CRI) is a US non-profit organization funding cancer research and based in New York City.  They were founded in 1953 to develop immunologically-based treatments for cancer, and despite their name are a funding body for research rather than a research institute themselves, working with other institutes and organizations. It was founded by Helen Coley Nauts and Oliver R. Grace with a $2,000 grant from Nelson Rockefeller. CRI was created in honor of Nauts' father, William Coley (1862–1936), an American orthopedic surgeon and a pioneer of cancer immunotherapy. Like Dr. Coley, the Institute focuses on immunological treatments for cancer, rather than traditional treatments, such as chemotherapy and surgery.

The organization offers research grants to students, postdoctoral fellows, and investigators at medical research institutions throughout the world. It also funds clinical trials testing promising immunotherapies in a variety of cancer types and convenes scientific conferences for tumor immunologists. In the fiscal year to June 2015, CRI reported income of $41.3 million and spending of $39 million: $29 million on research, $5 million on education, and $4 million on fundraising and administration.

Awards
The institute makes a number of awards for excellence in the field of cancer research.

William B. Coley Award

The William B. Coley Award is given annually to one or more scientists for outstanding achievements in the field of basic immunology and cancer immunology. Awardees receive an honorary medal and $5,000 prize. It is named for the pioneer of cancer immunotherapy, William B. Coley.

Lloyd J. Old Award

The Lloyd J. Old Award in Cancer Immunology recognizes an active scientist whose outstanding and innovative research in cancer immunology has had a far-reaching impact on the cancer field. It is named after Lloyd J. Old, one of the founders and standard-bearers of the field of cancer immunology.

Frederick W. Alt Award

The Frederick W. Alt Award recognizes outstanding success in academia or industry for research that may have a potentially major impact on immunology. It is named in honor of geneticist Frederick W. Alt.

Other awards are the Oliver R. Grace Award and the Helen Coley Nauts Award.

References

 

Cancer organizations based in the United States
1953 establishments in New York City
Medical and health organizations based in New York City